Mahuangliang Station is a station on Line 9 of Chongqing Rail Transit in Chongqing municipality, China, which opened in 2022. It is located in Jiangbei District.

References

Railway stations in Chongqing
Railway stations in China opened in 2022
Chongqing Rail Transit stations